Harrold Airport  is a public use airport in DeKalb County, Indiana, United States. It is located three nautical miles (6 km) northwest of the central business district of Butler, Indiana.

Facilities and aircraft 
Harrold Airport covers an area of 10 acres (4 ha) at an elevation of 925 feet (282 m) above mean sea level. It has one runway designated 18/36 with a gravel surface measuring 2,920 by 46 feet (890 x 14 m).

For the 12-month period ending December 31, 2009, the airport had 872 general aviation aircraft operations, an average of 72 per month. There are two single-engine aircraft based at this airport.

See also 
 List of airports in Indiana

References

External links 
 
 Aerial image as of April 1998 from USGS The National Map
 Aeronautical chart at SkyVector

Defunct airports in Indiana
Airports in Indiana
Transportation buildings and structures in DeKalb County, Indiana